Naursky (masculine), Naurskaya (feminine), or Naurskoye (neuter) may refer to:
Naursky District, a district of the Chechen Republic, Russia
Naurskaya, a rural locality (a stanitsa) in Naursky District of the Chechen Republic, Russia